Serranobatrachus ruthveni is a species of frog in the family Craugastoridae. It is endemic to the north-western slope of the Sierra Nevada de Santa Marta in the Magdalena Department, northern Colombia. The specific name ruthveni honors Alexander Grant Ruthven, an American herpetologist. Common name Ruthven's robber frog has been coined for this species.

Description
Adult males measure  and adult females  in snout–vent length. The head is almost as wide as the body. The snout is long, subacuminate in dorsal view and round in profile. The tympanum is visible. The fingers and the toes are long and slender and bear feeble lateral keels and discs that are broader than they are long. No webbing is present. The dorsum is pinkish tan, gray, or pale orange with darker markings. There is a dark canthal-supratympanic stripe. The venter is dirty white and has gray spots. Males have an internal vocal sac.

Habitat and conservation
It is associated with streams and the stream-side vegetation. Development is direct, without free-living tadpole stage.

This species is threatened by habitat loss and deterioration of its forest, páramo, and riparian habitats, primarily because of agricultural activities (slash-and-burn cultivation of crops and cattle raising). It occurs in the Sierra Nevada de Santa Marta National Natural Park as well as in the Fundación ProAves nature reserve El Dorado.

References

Amphibians of Colombia
Endemic fauna of Colombia
Amphibians described in 1985
Taxa named by John Douglas Lynch
Taxonomy articles created by Polbot